Silberschlag is a small, circular Impact crater in the central portion of the Moon. It was named after German astronomer Johann Silberschlag. It lies between the craters Agrippa to the southwest and Julius Caesar to the northeast. Silberschlag is bowl-shaped and is joined at the northern rim by a small ridge.

Just to the north is the prominent Rima Ariadaeus, a wide, linear rille that runs toward the east-southeast. This cleft is about 220 kilometers in length, and continues to the edge of Mare Tranquillitatis to the east.

Satellite craters
By convention these features are identified on lunar maps by placing the letter on the side of the crater midpoint that is closest to Silberschlag.

References

External links
Silberschlag at The Moon Wiki

Impact craters on the Moon